Count Gustav Horn af Björneborg (October 22, 1592 – May 10, 1657) was a Finnish nobleman of the Swedish Empire, military officer, and Governor-General.  
He was appointed member of the Royal Council in 1625, Field Marshal in 1628, Governor General of Livonia in 1652 and Lord High Constable since 1653. In the Thirty Years' War (1618–1648), he was instrumental as a commander in securing victory at the Battle of Breitenfeld, in 1631. He was High Councillor of the realm in 1625, elevated to the rank of field marshal in 1628, and sometimes commander-in-chief of Swedish forces in Germany during Thirty Years' War.  After the war, he served as Governor-General of Livonia 1652, President of War department and Lord High Constable in 1653.  In 1651, Queen Christina created him Count of Björneborg (Horn af Björneborg).

Biography

Background
Gustav Horn was born at Örbyhus  in Uppsala County, Sweden. He was the youngest son of Field Marshal Carl Horn and Agneta von Dellwig. He was born while his father was imprisoned in  Örbyhus Castle at Tierp. He was born into the Swedish (geographically and ethnically Finnish) noble family Horn af Kankas and was educated extensively in European universities. He studied military sciences under prince Maurice of Orange in the Netherlands. As a colonel, Gustav Horn took part in the siege of Riga in 1621 and was seriously wounded. He led troops which conquered Tartu in Livonian Estonia. With Count Jakob De la Gardie, he led the defense of Livonia against Poland in the late 1620s. At age 35, he was elevated to the rank of Field Marshal by King Gustav II Adolf.

Command of Swedish forces

When King Gustav II Adolf decided to join the war in Germany (1630), he appointed Gustav Horn as his second in command. At the Battle of Breitenfeld in 1631, Horn prevented the Imperial force under Tilly from flanking the main body of the Swedish army, after their Saxon allies had fled the field. After this Horn led troops in Upper (southern) Franconia and conquered among others, Mergentheim, the town of the Teutonic Order and the bishopric of Bamberg). He then went to Bavaria with the king. Horn was sent to lead troops in the Rhineland, where he occupied Koblenz and Trier, and continued to Swabia.

After the death of King Gustav II Adolf at Lützen in November 1632, Field Marshal Horn and General John Banér were appointed to the overall command of Swedish forces in Germany. Gustav Horn's father-in-law, the Chancellor Oxenstierna, took the leadership of the civil government.
When Horn was ordered to combine his troops with those of Bernhard of Weimar, the two men found themselves unable to work together, and they were given separate commands.

After Wallenstein's murder in 1634, Horn took some areas in Swabia: in the spring of that year, his troops unsuccessfully laid siege to the imperial city of Überlingen, which would have been a rich and valuable prize. In early September 1634 his forces, and those of Bernard of Saxony, were crushed at the Battle of Nördlingen by combined Habsburg and Spanish forces.  Horn was taken prisoner and held by the Roman Catholic army in Burghausen Castle until 1642.  He was exchanged for three imperial generals.

Later career

Following his exchange, Horn was appointed Vice President of the War Department.  During the war against Denmark-Norway in 1644, Horn led the attack on Skåne and conquered the whole province, except the towns of Malmö and Kristianstad. Malmö's siege lasted until the Treaty of Brömsebro brought the war to an end. 
In 1651, Horn received Pori (Björneborg)  on the west coast of Finland. His estate at Alūksne in Livonia (Marienborg) was made into a barony. Horn then served as Governor-General in Livonia, and as Lord High Constable of the empire, becoming Lord President of the War Department.
When the war against the Polish–Lithuanian Commonwealth broke out in 1655, Gustav Horn directed the defense of Sweden against possible Polish invasion.
Gustav Horn was one of the most capable of Gustav II Adolf's military commanders, and also an able administrator. His particular skills were in arranging  defenses for several sorts of situations. He also maintained relatively strict discipline, so his troops did not plunder and pillage as much as others.

Häringe Manor
Gustav Horn acquired  Häringe Manor (Häringe slott) at Västerhaninge parish in Södermanland during 1625. The estate was received as a gift from King Gustav II Adolf. The main building was built on the initiative of Gustav Horn and was completed in 1657.  After the death of Gustav Horn in 1657, the estate was inherited by his daughter Agneta Horn (1629–1672), by her daughter Hedvig Catharina Lillie (1695–1745) in 1730 and then by Carl Julius De la Gardie (1729–1786) in 1745.

Family
In 1628 Horn married first to Kristina Oxenstierna (1609 1631), daughter of Count and Chancellor Axel Oxenstierna. They had two children:
Agneta Horn (1629–1672) who married baron Lars Cruus of Gudhem, Lord of Harviala.

Axel Horn (1630–1631).

In 1643 Horn married  Sigrid Bielke (1620–1679). They had nine children:
Anna Katarina Horn (born and died 1644)
Kristina Horn (born and died 1646)
Ebba Sigrid Horn (born and died 1646), twin with Kristina
Helena Horn (1647–1648)
Maria Eleonora Horn (1648–1652)
Gustav Karl Horn (1650–1654)
Evert Horn (1652–1654)
Eva Horn (1653–1740), married Nils Bielke.
Hedvig Lovisa Horn (1655–17??), married firstly Ture Karlsson Sparre and secondly Bernhard von Liewen.

See also
Horn family

References

External links

Häringe slott website 

1592 births
1657 deaths
People from Tierp Municipality
Finnish admirals
Swedish admirals
Finnish Navy personnel
Finnish sailors
Finnish generals
Field marshals of Sweden
Governors-General of Sweden
Swedish Livonia
Swedish nobility
Members of the Privy Council of Sweden
Finnish Privy Councillors
Finnish people of the Thirty Years' War
17th-century Finnish nobility
Prisoners of war
17th-century Swedish politicians
16th-century Finnish nobility